At the 2010 Asian Games in the Mixed doubles tennis event, Sania Mirza and Leander Paes were the defending champions, but only Mirza participated, as Paes was involved in the Tour Finals. Mirza partnered up with Vishnu Vardhan. They went on to win the silver medal after losing to Latisha Chan and Yang Tsung-hua in the final 6–4, 1–6, [2–10].

Tie-breaks were used for the first two sets of each match, which was the best of three sets. If the score was tied at one set all, a 'super tie-break' (the first pairing to win at least 10 points by a margin of two points) would be used.

Schedule
All times are China Standard Time (UTC+08:00)

Results
Legend
WO — Won by walkover

Final

Top half

Bottom half

References
Draw

Mixed Doubles